The 1933 Chicago Maroons football team was an American football team that represented the University of Chicago during the 1933 Big Ten Conference football season. In their first season under head coach Clark Shaughnessy, the Maroons compiled a 3–3–2 record, finished in a tie for eighth place in the Big Ten Conference, and outscored their opponents by a combined total of 118 to 56.

Schedule

References

Chicago
Chicago Maroons football seasons
Chicago Maroons football